Kekunawala Grama Niladhari Division is a Grama Niladhari Division of the Udubaddawa Divisional Secretariat of Kurunegala District of North Western Province, Sri Lanka. It has Grama Niladhari Division Code 1493.

Kekunawala is a surrounded by the Karandavila, Kelegedara, Pahala Mandakondana, Divurumpola, Habarawewa, Kappangamuwa and Kandayaya Grama Niladhari Divisions.

Demographics

Ethnicity 
The Kekunawala Grama Niladhari Division has a Moor majority (76.2%) and a significant Sinhalese population (22.7%). In comparison, the Udubaddawa Divisional Secretariat (which contains the Kekunawala Grama Niladhari Division) has a Sinhalese majority (88.5%) and a significant Moor population (10.3%)

Religion 
The Kekunawala Grama Niladhari Division has a Muslim majority (76.8%) and a significant Buddhist population (22.3%). In comparison, the Udubaddawa Divisional Secretariat (which contains the Kekunawala Grama Niladhari Division) has a Buddhist majority (74.0%), a significant Roman Catholic population (14.4%) and a significant Muslim population (10.4%)

References 

Grama Niladhari Divisions of Udubaddawa Divisional Secretariat